The African diaspora in Finland refers to the residents of Finland of full or partial African ancestry, mostly from Sub-Saharan Africa. According to Statistics Finland, the total number of people in Finland with a close African background (Africans in Finland) was 57,496 in 2020.

The distinct adjacent term Afro-Finns, also referred to as Black Finns, can be used for Finns whose lineages are fully or partly in the populations of Sub-Saharan Africa ("Black Africa"). Afro-Finns have lived in Finland since the 19th century, and in 2009, according to Yle, there were an estimated 20,000 Afro-Finns in Finland.

History

Finns reacted to the first Africans in Finland with curiosity and amazement. During the 19th century, there were some Africans from the Americas who worked as servants for wealthy Russians in the Grand Duchy of Finland. The first known African who received Finnish citizenship was  who came to Finland from Ovamboland in 1888 and received Finnish citizenship in 1899.

Between the 1900s and the 1970s, the few Africans in Finland were mostly either students (for example from Nigeria and Ethiopia), political exiles from South Africa or people married to Finns. In World War II (1939–1945), there were some Afro-Finnish soldiers, and among them were Private 1st Class , who served as a ski patrol leader in the Karelian Isthmus and was killed in the Winter War, and Corporal Holger Sonntag, who was of African-American and German descent and served as a driver in both the Winter War and Continuation War.

In 1990, during the Somali Civil War, the first Somali refugees arrived in Finland. After that, due to their high total fertility rate and the high number of Somali family reunifications, quota refugees and asylum seekers, they rapidly became the largest African group in Finland. During the 2003 FIFA U-17 World Championship held in Finland, most of the Sierra Leone national under-17 football team's players defected to Finland due to their country's poor conditions after a civil war that had ended a year earlier.

Nowadays most people of African ancestry come to Finland from Africa, but many have also come from the United States, Latin America and other European countries. Especially Americans and British people of African ancestry have moved to Finland, mostly through marriage.

Demographics

As of 31 December 2020, according to Statistics Finland, the total number of people in Finland with a close African background is 57,496, which is 1.0% of the population of Finland. 47,041 (81.8%) of them are from Sub-Saharan Africa. 32,511 (56.5%) of them are men, while 24,985 (43.5%) are women.

Countries of origin

Countries with a significant African diaspora
The following countries outside Africa have a majority population of Afro-descendants (90% or more of the country's total population) and, as of 31 December 2020, a total of 127 expatriates or close descendants in Finland:
 The Bahamas – 5
 Barbados – 13
 Haiti – 11
 Jamaica – 97
 Saint Kitts and Nevis – 1

African languages

Distribution

In Kallahti, a neighborhood of Helsinki, 9.8% of the population consists of Africans.

On 31 December 2020, the region with the most people with a close African background was Uusimaa with 39,987 people (2.4% of the region's total population), which is 69.6% of their total population in Finland.

Citizenships
On 31 December 2020, there were 19,544 people who had dual citizenship of Finland and an African country.

Citizens of African countries who received Finnish citizenship by year:

 1990 – 70
 1991 – 101
 1992 – 104
 1993 – 67
 1994 – 56
 1995 – 81
 1996 – 120
 1997 – 180
 1998 – 788
 1999 – 1,365
 2000 – 522
 2001 – 406
 2002 – 419
 2003 – 403
 2004 – 426
 2005 – 605
 2006 – 658
 2007 – 671
 2008 – 891
 2009 – 466
 2010 – 368
 2011 – 400
 2012 – 1,559
 2013 – 1,923
 2014 – 1,750
 2015 – 1,946
 2016 – 2,137
 2017 – 2,448
 2018 – 1,904
 2019 – 1,499
 2020 – 1,250

People born in Africa who received Finnish citizenship by year:

 1990 – 37
 1991 – 87
 1992 – 86
 1993 – 42
 1994 – 58
 1995 – 78
 1996 – 117
 1997 – 175
 1998 – 559
 1999 – 829
 2000 – 332
 2001 – 275
 2002 – 306
 2003 – 290
 2004 – 329
 2005 – 387
 2006 – 397
 2007 – 426
 2008 – 627
 2009 – 329
 2010 – 279
 2011 – 297
 2012 – 1,043
 2013 – 1,344
 2014 – 1,350
 2015 – 1,447
 2016 – 1,590
 2017 – 1,844
 2018 – 1,480
 2019 – 1,231
 2020 – 972

Asylum seekers

1990–2013
From 1990 to 2013, a total of 14,481 African citizens sought asylum in Finland, which was 22.4% out of the total of 64,536 asylum seekers. African asylum seekers by country of citizenship:

 Somalia – 7,576
 Nigeria – 1,210
 Algeria – 723
 Angola – 577
 Democratic Republic of the Congo – 568
 Ghana – 477
 Ethiopia – 395
 Cameroon – 313
 Morocco – 306
 Zaire – 305
 The Gambia – 298
 Libya – 206
 Egypt – 124
 Guinea – 115
 Sierra Leone – 112
 Liberia – 106
 Sudan – 106
 Rwanda – 105
 Tunisia – 104
 Kenya – 102
 Senegal – 77
 Ivory Coast – 69
 Eritrea – 61
 Togo – 52
 Republic of the Congo – 45
 Mali – 43
 Uganda – 38
 Niger – 34
 Congo – 33
 Burundi – 29
 Tanzania – 27
 Mauritania – 23
 Zimbabwe – 18
 Burkina Faso – 17
 South Africa – 11
 Guinea-Bissau – 10
 Benin – 9
 Chad – 8
 Zambia – 8
 Equatorial Guinea – 7
 Malawi – 5
 Central African Republic – 4
 Djibouti – 3
 Gabon – 3
 Kongon demokraattinen kansantasavalta  – 3
 Lesotho – 3
 Namibia – 3
 South Sudan – 3
 Botswana – 2
 Eswatini – 2
 Madagascar – 1
 Mauritius – 1
 Mozambique – 1

There were not asylum seekers from Cape Verde, the Comoros, São Tomé and Príncipe or Seychelles.

2015–2020
From January 2015 to August 2020, there were a total of 7,935 African citizens who sought asylum in Finland; 14.6% out of the total of 54,520 asylum seekers. African asylum seekers by country of citizenship:

 Somalia – 3,736
 Eritrea – 861
 Nigeria – 718
 Morocco – 342
 Cameroon – 338
 Algeria – 237
 The Gambia – 235
 Ethiopia – 191
 Democratic Republic of the Congo – 156
 Angola – 124
 Ghana – 119
 Egypt – 104
 Libya – 92
 Sudan – 88
 Tunisia – 76
 Rwanda – 66
 Guinea – 61
 Senegal – 48
 Ivory Coast – 37
 Uganda – 37
 Kenya – 32
 Mali – 32
 Sierra Leone – 28
 Zimbabwe – 19
 Republic of the Congo – 15
 Togo – 15
 Niger – 13
 Tanzania – 13
 Burkina Faso – 12
 Burundi – 12
 Guinea-Bissau – 12
 Liberia – 12
 South Sudan – 10
 Central African Republic – 9
 South Africa – 8
 Zambia – 6
 Mauritania – 4
 Namibia – 4
 Comoros – 3
 Gabon – 3
 Chad – 2
 Benin – 1
 Cape Verde – 1
 Equatorial Guinea – 1
 Eswatini – 1
 Mozambique – 1

There were not asylum seekers from Botswana, Djibouti, Lesotho, Madagascar, Malawi, Mauritius, São Tomé and Príncipe or Seychelles.

Adoptions
From 1987 to 2019, a total of 911 people were adopted from Africa to Finland. 843 (92.5%) of them were from the countries of South Africa (508, 55.8%), Ethiopia (287, 31.5%) and Kenya (48, 5.3%).

Adoptees from Africa by year:

 1987 – 11
 1988 – 19
 1989 – 5
 1990 – 9
 1991 – 12
 1992 – 12
 1993 – 16
 1994 – 19
 1995 – 14
 1996 – 11
 1997 – 13
 1998 – 15
 1999 – 14
 2000 – 22
 2001 – 11
 2002 – 28
 2003 – 28
 2004 – 30
 2005 – 35
 2006 – 34
 2007 – 44
 2008 – 48
 2009 – 66
 2010 – 53
 2011 – 71
 2012 – 48
 2013 – 43
 2014 – 47
 2015 – 41
 2016 – 16
 2017 – 30
 2018 – 20
 2019 – 26

Marriages and cohabitation
On 31 December 2020, there were 4,589 Finnish citizens who were either married to or registered as cohabiting with citizens of African countries. 2,809 (61.2%) of the Finnish citizens were women and 1,780 (38.8%) were men; for both sexes the largest groups of partners were Somalian, Moroccan and Nigerian citizens. The next largest groups for Finnish women were Gambian and Ghanaian citizens, and for Finnish men Ethiopian and Kenyan citizens. On the same date, there were 4,725 African-born people who were either married to or registered as cohabiting with people born in Finland; 3,718 (78.7%) of the people born in Finland were women, while 1,007 (21.3%) were men.

Afro-Finnish identity, culture and media
According to an estimate in 2009 by Yle, there are 20,000 Afro-Finns in Finland, and thus, they compose a much larger ethnic minority than many other prominent large minorities in Finland, such as the Sami or Romani. The identity of Afro-Finns varies; some consider themselves Finns, while others have their own separate identity. Some actively cherish their connections to Africa through their African relatives and cultures, while for others their connections to Africa are more distant but still relevant to them.

Held annually since 2018, the Afrofinns Achievement Awards—presented by Afrofinns ry, an organization for "Finns and everyone else with African heritage living in Finland"—acknowledges, honors and celebrates the contribution of the Afro-community in Finland. In 2020,  2013 and celebrity, and Obi-West Utchaychukwu, the editor-in-chief of Diaspora Glitz Magazine, founded the beauty pageant The Face of African Queen for young women of African ancestry living in Finland.

Established in 1993, the magazine SCANDI-B was targeted to Black people in the Nordic countries. In 2010, Yle broadcast the three-episode documentary television series Afro-Suomen historia ("The history of Afro-Finland") about early Afro-Finns. The multimedia  ("Brown Girls") focuses on Afro-Finns and other people of colour in Finland. The Afro-Finnish Diaspora Glitz Magazine won the category of Best Media at the 2019 Afrofinns Achievement Awards.

Racism

During the 1952 Summer Olympics held in Helsinki, Finland, some warned Finnish women against taking an interest in "exotic" athletes and pressured Finnish women to "act appropriately" within the vicinity of black people, "". The Finnish word  (cognate with negro) was long considered a neutral equivalent for "negro". In 2002, the usage notes of  shifted from "perceived as derogatory by some" to "generally derogatory" in the dictionary Kielitoimiston sanakirja, edited by the Institute for the Languages of Finland.

Nationwide racism started to grow after the first Somali refugees arrived in Finland in the 1990s during the Somali Civil War. Finnish skinheads perpetrated attacks against Africans, and especially the city of Joensuu in eastern Finland grew to be . In the municipality of Nastola in southern Finland, the police had to protect the local refugee center from the violence of the locals, as they committed a shooting. Other incidents included a bomb that detonated in a refugee center in Valkeala, a municipality in southeast Finland, and an attack by skinheads against Somalis in Hakunila, Vantaa, in southern Finland.

In the late 20th century and the 21st century, some ethnic Finnish women married to or cohabiting with younger black men have faced discrimination as they are sometimes stereotyped as sex tourists in Finnish society.

According to the study "Being Black in the EU" by the Fundamental Rights Agency published in 2018, 63% of Afro-Finns in Finland had experienced racist harassment, which had appeared as offensive gestures, comments, threats or violence. This was the highest percentage of the twelve European Union member states that were included in the study, much higher than for example in Malta which was 20%. 14% stated they had experienced violence in Finland due to their skin colour, which also was the highest of the participating countries, much higher than in, for example, Portugal where 2% had experienced similar violence.

A report published in 2020 by the  found that four out of five people with an African background had experienced racial discrimination in Finland due to their skin colour.

Notable people

Citizens and residents of Finland of full or partial African ancestry

See also categories: Finnish people of African ancestry, Expatriates in Finland (African country subcategories) and Immigrants to Finland (African country subcategories)

Actors

 Fathi Ahmed (born 1991), actor and stand-up comedian of Somali descent
 , French Guianan-Martiniquais actor
 , half-Moroccan actress
  (born 1961), British-born actress, singer and model of Jamaican descent
  (born 2001/2002), actor of African ancestry
  (born 1999), actress of African-American descent
  (born 1955), American-born African-American actor and drummer
  (born 1964), half-Kenyan actor
 Pearl Hobson (1879–1919), American-born African-American actress, singer, dancer and cabaret artist in the Russian Empire
  (born 1974), half-Chadian actress
  (born 1988), half-Togolese actor
  (born 1987), half-Kenyan actor
  (born 1972), half-Cameroonian actress
  (born 1989), half-Nigerian actor
  (born 1989), Ghanaian-born actress
 , half-Ghanaian actress
 , Costa Rican-born actress

Artists
 Sasha Huber (born 1975), Swiss-born artist of Haitian descent
  (born 1988), fashion designer of African-American descent
  (1928–2021), American-born African-American visual artist and designer

Beauty pageant contestants
  (born 1990), half-Moroccan  2010
 Sara Chafak (born 1990), half-Moroccan-Berber Miss Finland 2012
  (born 1987), Congolese-born Miss Helsinki 2013 and celebrity
 Dana Mononen (born 1999/2000), half-Guadeloupean Miss World Finland 2019
 Lola Odusoga (born 1977), half-Nigerian model, presenter and Miss Finland 1996

Dancers
  (born 1985), half-Cameroonian dancer and choreographer
 , Ethiopian-born dancer

Entrepreneurs
 Soraya Bahgat, social entrepreneur of Egyptian descent
  (born 1984), Emirati-born entrepreneur of Egyptian descent
  (born 1974), Mozambican-born entrepreneur and director

Film people
 Khadar Ahmed (born 1981), Somalian-born screenwriter and film director
 Jessie Chisi (born 1986/1987), Zambian-born film director and screenwriter
  (born 1956), Algerian-born documentary film director

Journalists
 , Ghanaian-born journalist
  (born 1975), half-Ugandan journalist
  (born 1983/1984), television journalist of African-American descent
 Minna Salami (born 1978), half-Nigerian journalist

Musicians

  (born 1992), half-Moroccan hip hop musician
  (born 1973), Ethiopian-born drummer and percussionist
  (born 1978), half-Senegalese singer and actor
 Eric Bibb (born 1951), American-born African-American blues musician
  (born 1993/1994), half-Nigerian hip hop musician
 Eddie Boyd (1914–1994), American-born African-American blues pianist and singer
 Daco Junior (born 1990), Angolan-born musician
 Raymond Ebanks (born 1970), half-Jamaican musician
 Michael Ekeghasi (born 1985), Nigerian-born singer-songwriter
 Lee Gaines (1914–1987), American-born African-American jazz singer
  (born 1987), Congolese-born rapper
  (born 1988), singer and footballer of Nigerian descent
  (born 1995), half-Tunisian DJ and hip hop musician
 Juno (born 1987), half-Kenyan rapper
  (born 1994), musician of Somalian descent
 Noah Kin (born 1994), Norwegian-born half-Nigerian rapper
  (born 1991/1992), rapper of Somalian descent
  (born 1953), Ghanaian-born musician and sex offender
 Mad Ice (born 1980), Ugandan-born singer-songwriter
  (born 1962), Senegalese-born musician
  (born 1985), Liberian-born musician
 Rummy Nanji, Tanzanian-born singer known from the Finnish band 
 James Nikander (born 1990), half-Tanzanian rapper, bodybuilder and Internet personality
  (born late 1970s), Cuban-born musician
 OX (born 1975), half-Egyptian bass guitarist
  (born 1992), rapper of Gambian descent
 Pete Parkkonen (born 1990), singer of partial Martiniquais descent
  (born 1987), Congolese-born rapper
  (born 1990), Ethiopian-born rapper
 Ismaila Sané (born 1956), Senegalese-born musician
 Jackson Shuudifonya (born 1985), musician of Namibian descent, known from the Finnish band 
 T.L, half-Jamaican musician known from the Finnish band TCT
  (born 1950), Jamaican-born reggae musician
 Tiahu, half-Jamaican musician known from the Finnish band TCT
  (born 1990), Angolan-born rapper
 , singer-songwriter of partial Martiniquais descent
 Mirel Wagner (born 1987), Ethiopian-born singer-songwriter
 Nicole Willis (born 1963), American-born African-American singer, songwriter and painter
 Yasmine Yamajako (born 1990/1991), half-Beninese singer
  (born 1996), half-Ghanaian rapper

Politicians

 Zahra Abdulla (born 1965), Somalian-born politician
 Abdirahman Mohamed Abdullahi (born 1955), Somalian-born politician
 Fadumo Dayib (born 1972), Kenyan-born politician of Somalian descent
 Fatim Diarra (born 1986), half-Malian politician
  (born 1967), Somalian-born politician
 Sari Essayah (born 1967), half-Moroccan politician and former racewalker
 Bella Forsgrén (born 1992), Ethiopian-born member of the Parliament of Finland
 Abdirahim Hussein Mohamed (born 1978), Somalian-born radio journalist and politician
  (born 1979), Moroccan-born activist and politician
  (died 2011), Somalian-born politician
 Suldaan Said Ahmed (born 1993), Somalian-born activist and politician
 Jani Toivola (born 1977), half-Kenyan actor, dancer, presenter and member of the Parliament of Finland (2011–2019)
 Faisal Ali Warabe (born 1948), Somalian-born politician

Scientists
  (born 1962), Tunisian-born professor
 Kelsey Harrison (born 1933), Nigerian-born gynaecologist and researcher
  (born 1945), American-born African-American linguist and actor
  (born 1958), Somalian-born physician and researcher

Sportspeople

  (born 1999), half-Chadian long jumper and triple jumper
 Amin Asikainen (born 1976), half-Moroccan boxer
 Semir Ben-Amor (born 1982), half-Tunisian ice hockey player
 Josef Boumedienne (born 1978), half-Algerian ice hockey player
  (born 1996), South Sudanese-born long-distance runner
  (born 1995), half-Moroccan sprinter
 Pierre Collura (born 1989), Malagasy-born sailor

 Seppo Evwaraye (born 1982), half-Nigerian former player of American football
 Christopher Gibson (born 1992), half-Saint Lucian ice hockey goaltender
  (born 1984), half-Algerian boxer
  (born 1982), Cuban-born volleyball player
  (born 1999), half-Nigerian ice hockey player
 Mimosa Jallow (born 1994), half-Gambian swimmer
  (born 1981/1982), Ethiopian-born exercise instructor
 Francis Kirwa (born 1974), Kenyan-born long-distance runner
 Wilson Kirwa (born 1974), Kenyan-born runner and writer
  (born 1975), half-Nigerian sprinter
 Billy Konchellah (born 1961), Kenyan-born middle-distance runner
  (born 1986), Kenyan-born long-distance runner
 Frantz Kruger (born 1975), White South African-born discus thrower
 Matti Lamberg (born 1993), half-Moroccan-Berber ice hockey player
  (born 1986), Cuban-born boxer
 Faye Njie (born 1993), half-Gambian judoka
  (born 1975), half-Nigerian karateka
  (born 2000), ice hockey player of African-American descent
  (born 2001), ice hockey player of African-American descent
  (born 1985), Nigerian-born sprinter
 Michael Quarshie (born 1979), half-Ghanaian player of American football
  (born 1976), Kenyan-born long-distance runner
  (born 1989), half-Algerian hammer thrower
 Frank Zoko Ble (born 1975), Ivorian-born murderer and former karateka

Basketball players

 Fiifi Aidoo (born 1996), Ghanaian-born basketball player
  (born 1984), Ghanaian-born basketball player
  (born 2000), basketball player of Cameroonian-Moroccan descent
  (born 1987), half-Ghanaian basketball player
  (born 1983), American-born African-American basketball player
  (born 1990), basketball player of African-American descent
 Bernard Harris (born 1950), American-born African-American basketball coach and former basketball player
  (born 1958), American-born African-American former basketball player
  (born 1995), basketball player of African-American descent
  (born 1950), American-born African-American basketball coach and former basketball player
 Shawn Huff (born 1984), basketball player of African-American descent
 Pierre Jallow (born 1979), Gambian-born basketball player
  (born 1957), American-born African-American basketball coach and former basketball player
 Awak Kuier (born 2001), Egyptian-born basketball player of South Sudanese descent
  (born 1987), basketball player of African-American descent
  (born 1952), American-born African-American entrepreneur and former basketball player
 Gerald Lee Jr. (born 1987), basketball player of African-American descent
  (born 1951), American-born African-American basketball coach and former basketball player
  (born 1979), American-born African-American former basketball player
 Jonathan Moore (born 1957), American-born African-American former basketball player
  (born 1994), basketball player of African-American descent
 Michaela Moua (born 1976), half-Ivorian former basketball player
  (born 1992), basketball player of African-American descent
  (born 1984), basketball player of African-American descent
  (born 1953), American-born African-American basketball coach and former basketball player
  (born 1988), basketball player of African-American descent
  (born 1975), half-Jamaican former basketball player
 Damon Williams (born 1973), American-born African-American basketball player
 Jamar Wilson (born 1984), American-born African-American basketball player

Footballers

 Nosh A Lody (born 1989), Congolese-born footballer
 Zakaria Abahassine (born 1988), half-Moroccan footballer
 Seth Ablade (born 1983), Ghanaian-born footballer
 Abdulkadir Said Ahmed (born 1999), Somalian-born footballer
 Nikolai Alho (born 1993), half-Ghanaian footballer
 Christian Aniche Izuchukwu (born 1981), Nigerian-born footballer
 Nnaemeka Anyamele (born 1994), footballer of Nigerian descent
 Roosa Ariyo (born 1994), half-Nigerian footballer
 Felipe Aspegren (born 1994), Colombian-born footballer
 Jasin-Amin Assehnoun (born 1998), half-Moroccan footballer
 Serge Atakayi (born 1999), Congolese-born footballer
  (born 2001), half-Nigerian footballer
 Enoch Banza (born 2000), footballer of Congolese descent
 Patrick Bantamoi (born 1986), Sierra Leonean-born football goalkeeper
 Moshood Bola (born 1968), Nigerian-born football manager and former footballer
  (born 1996), footballer of Angolan descent
 Solomon Duah (born 1993), footballer of Ghanaian descent
 Adel Eid (born 1984), half-Egyptian footballer
 Amos Ekhalie (born 1988), Kenyan-born footballer
 Iidle Elmi (born 1995), Somalian-born footballer
 Cheyne Fowler (born 1982), half-White South African footballer
 Fabrice Gatambiye (born 2000), Congolese-born footballer
 Niko Hämäläinen (born 1997), American-born footballer of African-American descent
 Nora Heroum (born 1994), half-Moroccan footballer
 Segun Ikudehinbu (born 1989), Nigerian-born footballer
 Abaas Ismail (born 1998), footballer of Somalian descent
 Omar Jama (born 1998), footballer of Somalian descent
  (born 1993), footballer of Somalian descent
 Glen Kamara (born 1995), footballer of Sierra Leonean descent
  (born 1995), half-Sudanese footballer
 Kevin Kouassivi-Benissan (born 1999), footballer of Togolese descent
  (born 1994), Congolese-born footballer
  (born 1988), Sudanese-born footballer
  (born 1991), Congolese-born footballer
 Obed Malolo (born 1997), footballer of Congolese descent
  (born 1995), footballer of Cameroonian-Congolese descent
 Sakari Mattila (born 1989), half-Algerian footballer.
 Aristote Mboma (born 1994), Congolese-born footballer
 Medo (born 1987), Sierra Leonean-born footballer
 Abukar Mohamed (born 1999), Somalian-born footballer
 Hussein Mohamed (born 1997), Somalian-born footballer
 Kevin Mombilo (born 1993), Congolese-born footballer
 Mehdi El Moutacim (born 2000), half-Moroccan footballer
 Kelechukwu Nnajiofor (born 1990), Nigerian-born footballer
 Echiabhi Okodugha (born 1988), Nigerian-born footballer
 Nicholas Otaru (born 1986), half-Nigerian former footballer
  (born 1985), Ghanaian-born former footballer
 Steven Polack (born 1961), English-born former footballer and football manager of West Indian descent
 Youness Rahimi (born 1995), half-Moroccan footballer
 Sami Rähmönen (born 1987), half-Moroccan footballer
 David Ramadingaye (born 1989), half-Chadian footballer
 Sharp Räsänen (born 1999), footballer of Nigerian descent
 Klebér Saarenpää (born 1975), Swedish-born half-Guinean football manager and former footballer
 Ahmed Said Ahmed (born 1998), Somalian-born footballer
  (born 1999), Angolan-born footballer
 Pyry Soiri (born 1994), half-Namibian footballer
 Malick Thiaw (born 2001), half-Senegalese footballer
 Robin Tihi (born 2002), Swedish-born half-Moroccan footballer
 Henry Chidozie Ugwunna (born 1989), Nigerian-born footballer
 Babatunde Wusu (born 1984), Nigerian-born footballer
  (born 1995), Angolan-born footballer

Writers
 Ronald Fair (1932–2018), American-born African-American writer and sculptor
  (born 1979), Somalian-born writer
  (born 1974), half-Egyptian writer

Others

 Farhia Abdi (born 1972/1973), Somalian-born  for 2020
  (born 1982), Somalian-born activist
 Aki Abiodun (born 1971), half-Nigerian contestant on the Finnish version of Big Brother and presenter
  (born 1987), Somalian-born activist
 François Bazaramba (born 1951), Rwandan-born criminal who was sentenced to life imprisonment in Finland for participating in the Rwandan genocide
  (1875–1959), half-Bantu teacher, choral conductor and theatre director from Ovamboland
  (born 1993), media personality, YouTuber and musician of Somalian descent
  (born 1974), Somalian-born murderer and sex offender
  (born 1977), half-Chadian presenter
  (born 1940), Moroccan-born circus performer
  (born 1970), Kenyan-born project manager and Refugee Woman of the Year for 1999
 Gibril Massaquoi (born 1970), Sierra Leonean-born detainee
 Amran Mohamed Ahmed (born 1954), Somalian-born Refugee Woman of the Year for 2005
  (born 1974), Somalian-born Refugee Woman of the Year for 2011
 Michele Murphy-Kaulanen (born 1980), celebrity of African-American descent and the wife of Sampo Kaulanen, a celebrity and the manager of Jounin Kauppa
  (1903–1940), Latvian-born soldier of African ancestry
 Nimo Samatar (born 1995), contestant on the Finnish version of Big Brother and blogger of Somalian descent
  (born 1992), Angolan-born media personality, YouTuber, presenter and musician
 Steven Thomas (born 1961), American-born African-American sex offender
 Leyla Väänänen (born 1992), half-Somalian contestant on the Finnish version of Big Brother
  (born 1993/1994), half-Somalian human rights activist

People of the Finnish diaspora with African ancestry

This list is for notable people of African ancestry who also belong to the Finnish diaspora (i.e. Finnish emigrants and their descendants) but do not hold Finnish citizenship. Many of them maintain their ties to Finland.

Germany
 Misan Haldin (born 1982), half-Nigerian former basketball player
  (born 1984), half-Nigerian basketball player

Sweden

 Patrick Amoah (born 1986), half-Ghanaian footballer
 Ali Boulala (born 1979), half-Algerian skateboarder
 Pia Conde (born 1970), half-Cuban journalist
 Mehdi Ghezali (born 1979), half-Algerian detainee of the Guantanamo Bay detention camp
 Jean-Louis Huhta (born 1965), half-Trinidadian musician
 Aino Jawo (born 1986), half-Gambian singer
 Monir Kalgoum (born 1984), half-Tunisian ice hockey player
 Janice Kavander (born 1994), half-Ugandan singer
 Bianca Kronlöf (born 1985), actress of Afro-Trinidadian descent
  (born 1987), actress, musician and screenwriter of Afro-Trinidadian descent
 Elizabeth and Victoria Lejonhjärta (born 1990), half-Gambian-Senegalese-Sierra Leonean twin models, bloggers, writers and social media personalities
 Kerim Mrabti (born 1994), half-Tunisian footballer
 Näääk (born 1983), half-Gambian rapper
 Yolanda Ngarambe (born 1991), half-Rwandan middle-distance runner
 Sam-E, half-Tunisian hip hop musician
 Rami Shaaban (born 1975), half-Egyptian footballer
 Adam Tensta (born 1983), half-Gambian rapper
 Demba Traoré (born 1982), half-Malian footballer

United Kingdom
 Alex Sawyer (born 1993), half-Ghanaian actor
 Marc Wadsworth (born 1955), half-Jamaican activist and journalist

United States

 Tyra Banks (born 1973), African-American television personality, model, producer, businesswoman, actress and author
 Drew Gooden (born 1981), African-American basketball player
 Carla Harvey (born 1976), African-American singer
 Jillian Hervey (born 1989), African-American singer and dancer
 Allan Mansoor (born 1964), half-Egyptian politician
 Dan O'Brien (born 1966), African-American former decathlete and Olympic gold medalist
 Redfoo (born 1975), African-American musician
 Denzel Wells (born 1990), African-American player of American football, actor and contestant on the season 21 of America's Next Top Model
 Chris Williams (born 1967), African-American actor
 Vanessa Williams (born 1963), African-American singer, actress, fashion designer and Miss America 1984

Notes

References

External links
 
 

 
Finland
Ethnic groups in Finland